Kikki is an eponymous studio album by Kikki Danielsson, released in November 1982. The album peaked at 19th position on the Swedish Albums Chart. In July 2009, the album was digitally released on iTunes.

Track listing

Side A

Side B

Charts

References

1982 albums
Kikki Danielsson albums